As one of the leading clubs in East Germany, Dynamo Dresden provided 36 East German internationals, including the country's second most-capped player, Hans-Jürgen Dörner, and its joint second top scorer, Hans-Jürgen Kreische. Kreische and Siegmar Wätzlich were in East Germany's squad for their only World Cup appearance (1974), while twelve Dynamo players won Olympic medals, including six gold medallists in 1976. After German reunification a number of Dynamo players went on to represent the Germany national team, including Jens Jeremies, Ulf Kirsten, Olaf Marschall and Alexander Zickler. Dynamo have also seen internationals from other nations, including Australia (Joshua Kennedy and Mark Schwarzer), the Czech Republic (Ivo Ulich and Tomas Votava), Slovenia (Klemen Lavrič and Miran Pavlin) and Sweden (Johnny Ekström).

Five Dynamo Dresden players were named East German Footballer of the Year: Hans-Jürgen Dörner, Hans-Jürgen Kreische, Andreas Trautmann, Ulf Kirsten and Torsten Gütschow. Dörner won the award three times, and the latter three players were its last three winners. Kreische and Gütschow were the leading scorers in the DDR-Oberliga seven times between them.

Perhaps the most notable Dynamo Dresden player is Matthias Sammer. He played for the club from 1985 to 1990, during which he won 23 caps for East Germany. He later made 51 appearances for Germany, winning the European Championship in 1996 and played at club level for VfB Stuttgart, Internazionale and Borussia Dortmund. With the latter he won two German titles, the UEFA Champions League and the Intercontinental Cup, and was named European Footballer of the Year in 1996.

This list covers players who have played 40 or more matches for SG Dynamo Dresden, except statistics for the lower levels of East German football are hard to find, so this period is not covered.

List of players

See also
:Category:Dynamo Dresden players
The current Dynamo Dresden squad

References

General

Specific

Players
 
Dynamo Dresden
Association football player non-biographical articles